The 2018–19 season was UANL's second competitive season and second season in the Liga MX Femenil, the top flight of Mexican women's football.

UANL classified to the playoffs on both Apertura 2018 and Clausura 2019 tournaments, reaching the final twice. On the Apertura, Tigres lost the final in penalties against América. On the Clausura, UANL won the championship defeating Monterrey in a rematch of the Clausura 2018 final.

Squad

Apertura

Clausura

Transfers

In

Out

Coaching staff

Competitions

Overview

Torneo Apertura

League table

Matches

Playoffs

Quarterfinals

Semifinals

Final

Torneo Clausura

League table

Matches

Playoffs

Quarterfinals

Semifinals

Final

Statistics

Appearances and goals

|-

|-
! colspan=10 style=background:#dcdcdc | Players that left the club during the season
|-

|}

Goalscorers

Hat-tricks

Own goals

References

Tigres UANL (women) seasons
Mexican football clubs 2018–19 season